The 2003–04 Arizona Wildcats men's basketball team represented the University of Arizona during the 2003–04 NCAA Division I men's basketball season.  Led by Lute Olson in his 21st year as Arizona's head coach, the team played their home games at McKale Center in Tucson, Arizona as members of the Pacific-10 Conference.

The team went 11–7 in regular-season conference play.  They advanced to the semifinals of the 2004 Pac-10 tournament before losing to Washington 90–85.  Seeded ninth in the South Region of the 2004 NCAA tournament, Arizona fell 80–76 to Seton Hall in the first round.  The team went 20–10 overall.

After the season sophomore small forward Andre Iguodala entered the 2004 NBA draft in which he was selected ninth overall by the Philadelphia 76ers.

Roster

References

External links
 Arizona Wildcats men's basketball official website

Arizona Wildcats men's basketball seasons
Arizona
Arizona Wildcats men's basketball team
Arizona Wildcats men's basketball team
Arizona